Tiverton Center, or just Tiverton on some maps, is an unincorporated rural village in Coshocton County, in the U.S. state of Ohio. It is located along and about the intersection of Ohio State Highway 206 and Coshocton County Road 20. There is a church and a grange hall located there, and a number of houses, but no other businesses or services. Google Maps videographed Tiverton Center along the intersecting highways which make up its main street, but does not mark the village as distinct from its surrounding township on its maps!

History
Tiverton Center was named for its location near the geographical center of Tiverton Township. It once contained a post office under the name Yankee Ridge. This post office was established in 1854, and remained in operation until 1894.

References

Unincorporated communities in Coshocton County, Ohio
1854 establishments in Ohio
Populated places established in 1854
Unincorporated communities in Ohio